Ohio v. Roberts, 448 U.S. 56 (1980), is a United States Supreme Court decision dealing with the Confrontation Clause of the Sixth Amendment to the United States Constitution.

Factual background 
Herschel Roberts was charged with forgery of a check and with possession of stolen credit cards. At the preliminary hearing, defense counsel called the victims' daughter to the stand and tried to elicit from her an admission that she provided the defendant with the checks and the credit card but failed to inform the defendant that she did not have permission to use them. Counsel was unable to elicit this admission nor did the prosecutor cross-examine the witness.

The daughter was subpoenaed five times but never appeared for trial. At trial, the defendant testified that the daughter had given him her parents' checkbook and credit cards with the understanding he could use them. The State, on rebuttal, offered the transcript of the daughter's testimony pursuant to Ohio Rev. Code Ann. Section 2945.49 (1975) which permits the use of preliminary examination testimony of a witness who “cannot for any reason be produced at trial.” The defense objected asserting that use of the transcript violated the Confrontation Clause of the Sixth Amendment to the United States Constitution (incorporated to the States under the Fourteenth Amendment to the United States Constitution). The trial court admitted the transcript and the defendant was convicted. The Supreme Court of Ohio overturned the conviction. That court held that the daughter's absence at trial and the lack of cross-examination at the preliminary hearing violated the Confrontation Clause.

Opinion of the Court

The Supreme Court held that the daughter's statement did not violate the Confrontation Clause. They reasoned that out-of-court statements can be admissible if they bear an adequate “indicia of reliability,” even if the declarant is not available to testify in court. They found that one could infer reliability in cases where the evidences falls “within a firmly rooted hearsay exception,” but even in other cases, if “particularized guarantees of trustworthiness” can be shown, the evidence would be admitted.

Subsequent history

Ohio v. Roberts is no longer controlling authority. The Supreme Court later ruled, in Crawford v. Washington, that because the Sixth Amendment to the United States Constitution specifies the right to confrontation, an “indicia of reliability” was not an adequate substitute for cross-examination. But the Court's recent decision in Michigan v. Bryant may signal a "resurrection" of Roberts, as the Court  based its decision on reliability of the out-of-court statement, rather than on the Defendant's opportunity to confront the witness bearing testimony against him.

See also
California v. Green, established the concept of the indicia of reliability.
Mancusi v. Stubbs,  
Crawford v. Washington, a later case which reiterated some and rejected other findings of the Court.
List of United States Supreme Court cases, volume 448

References

Further reading

External links
 

United States Supreme Court cases
United States Supreme Court cases of the Burger Court
Overruled United States Supreme Court decisions
1980 in United States case law
Confrontation Clause case law